Gregorio Licaros was the fourth Governor of the Central Bank of the Philippines from 1970 to 1981. From Meycauayan, Bulacan, married to Concepcion Blanco and had two sons, Gregorio Jr. and Abelardo

References

Governors of the Bangko Sentral ng Pilipinas
Living people
People from Meycauayan
Ferdinand Marcos administration personnel
Year of birth missing (living people)